Andris Treimanis (born 16 March 1985) is a Latvian professional football referee. He has been a full international for FIFA since 2011. He refereed the final of the 2019 FIFA U-17 World Cup in Brazil.

References

External links 
 
 
 
 

1985 births
Living people
Latvian football referees